San Jose Earthquakes was a professional soccer club that played from 1974 to 1988. The team began as an expansion franchise in the North American Soccer League (NASL), and was originally set to play in San Francisco; but slow season ticket sales led to a late switch to San Jose's Spartan Stadium. The switch to sports-starved San Jose was an immediate hit, and the Earthquakes led the league with attendance over 15,000 per game in 1974, double the league average. The team's success led Spartan Stadium to be chosen as site of the first NASL Soccer Bowl in 1975. From 1983 to 1984, the team was known as the Golden Bay Earthquakes.  During this time, it also played in the original Major Indoor Soccer League and in the NASL's indoor circuit, winning the first ever NASL indoor tournament in 1975. Their indoor games were first played at the Cow Palace and later at the Oakland Coliseum Arena.

Following the collapse of the NASL in 1984, the team's name reverted to San Jose Earthquakes prior to joining the Western Soccer Alliance in 1985, where it played until the league's folding after the 1988 season.

The name Earthquakes was created by general manager Dick Berg, but was criticized due to San Jose's proximity to the San Andreas Fault.

Year-by-year

Outdoor:

Note: The team played as the Golden Bay Earthquakes in the 1983 and 1984 seasons.

NASL and MISL Indoor Soccer

In the winter of 1975, the NASL ran a two-tiered, 16-team indoor tournament with four regional winners meeting in a "final-four" style championship. Not only did San Jose host their region at the Cow Palace, but the final four as well. The Quakes swept through the tournament unscathed, defeating the Tampa Bay Rowdies 8–5 in the final to the delight of their fans. San Jose teammates Paul Child and Gabbo Garvic were named co-MVPs. In 1976, the Earthquakes again advanced to the final four before losing to the Rochester Lancers at the Bayfront Center in Florida. They would rebound the following day to win the 3rd Place match 5–2 over Dallas. The NASL would not begin playing full indoor seasons until 1979–80, but San Jose did not fare nearly as well in that format. The NASL canceled its 1982–83 indoor season. As a result, the Earthquakes along with Chicago and San Diego played in the MISL that winter.

Note: The team played the 1982/83 and 1983/84 seasons as the Golden Bay Earthquakes.

Head coaches

 Momčilo Gavrić (1974)
 Ivan Toplak (1974–1975)
 Momčilo Gavrić (1975–1978)
 Terry Fisher (1978–1979)
 Peter Stubbe (1979)
 Bill Foulkes (1980)
 Jimmy Gabriel (1981)
 Peter Short (1982)

 Joe Mallett (1982)
 Dragan Popović (1983–1984)
 Laurie Calloway (1985)
 Steve Litt (1986)
 Barney Boyce (1987–1988)
 Tomás Boy (1988)
 Tony Zanotto (1988)

Honors

Championships
 1975 NASL indoor
 1985 WACS
 1987 WSA (runner-up)
 1988 WSA (runner-up)

NASL Division titles
 1974 Southern Division, Pacific Conference
 1975 Region 4 (indoor)
 1976 West Regional (indoor)

NASL Most Valuable Player
 1975 Paul Child & Gabbo Garvic (indoor)
 1983–84 Steve Zungul (indoor)
 1984 Steve Zungul

North American Player of the Year
 1984 Branko Šegota

Coach of the Year
 1983 Don Popovic

Leading Scorer
 1974 Paul Child 36 points
 1975 Paul Child (indoor) 31 points
 1982–83 Steve Zungul (MISL) 122 points
 1983–84 Steve Zungul (indoor) 119 points
 1984 Steve Zungul 50 points
 1987 Joe Mihaljevic 16 points

Leading Goal Scorer
 1974 Paul Child 15 goals
 1975 Paul Child (indoor) 14 goals
 1976 Juli Veee (indoor) 8 goals
 1982–83 Steve Zungul (MISL) 75 goals
 1983–84 Steve Zungul (indoor) 63 goals
 1984 Steve Zungul 20 goals
 1987 Joe Mihaljevic 7 goals

Assists Leader
 1983–84 Steve Zungul (indoor) 56 assists
 1988 Dzung Tran 4 assists (tied with 2 others)

All-Star First Team selections
 1974 Paul Child
 1976 António Simões
 1983 Stan Terlecki, Steve Zungul
 1984 Steve Zungul
 1986 Chance Fry
 1987 Barney Boyce, Tim Martin, Joe Mihaljevic, George Pastor, Robbie Zipp
 1988 Tomás Boy, Abuelo Cruz

All-Star Second Team selections
 1981 George Best
 1984 Branko Šegota
 1986 Dzung Tran
 1988 Chris Dangerfield, Dzung Tran

All-Star Honorable Mentions
 1974 Laurie Calloway, Dieter Zajdel
 1976 Mark Liveric
 1977 António Simões
 1982 Vince Hilaire, Godfrey Ingram
 1983 Mihalj Keri
 1984 Fernando Clavijo

Indoor All-Star/All-Tournament selections
 1975 Paul Child, Gabbo Garvic
 1976 Juli Veee
 1980–81 George Best, Mike Hewitt
 1983–84 Fernando Clavijo, Steve Zungul

Indoor All-Star Game selections
 1984 Fernando Clavijo, Steve Zungul (starters)

U.S. Soccer Hall of Fame
 1997 Johnny Moore
 2003 Paul Child
 2005 Fernando Clavijo

Canadian Soccer Hall of Fame
 2001 Gerry Gray
 2002 Branko Šegota, Mike Sweeney
 2009 Mike Stojanović
 2011 Victor Kodelja

Indoor Soccer Hall of Fame
 2012 Don Popovic, Branko Šegota, Juli Veee, Steve Zungul
 2014 Fernando Clavijo
 2019 Stan Terlecki

References

External links
 NASL year-by-year standings
 MISL year-by-year standings
 Western Soccer League year-by-year standings

North American Soccer League (1968–1984) teams
Defunct soccer clubs in California
Defunct indoor soccer clubs in the United States
E
San Jose Earthquakes
Major Indoor Soccer League (1978–1992) teams
Western Soccer Alliance teams
Soccer clubs in California
1974 establishments in California
1988 disestablishments in California
Association football clubs disestablished in 1988
Association football clubs established in 1974